Tarzana, the Wild Girl is a 1969 Italian adventure film written and directed by Guido Malatesta.

Plot
The granddaughter of Sir Donovan is believed dead with her mother, and father in a plane crash in the African jungle. Fifteen years later, vague reports arrive in Europe that a Kenyan tribe has elected a white woman as their queen, Tarzana (meaning 'strange woman' in Bantu), and Sir Donovan wants to believe she is his granddaughter.

Cast
 Femi Benussi as Tarzana/Elizabeth 
 Ken Clark as Glen Shipper 
 Franca Polesello as Doris 
 Beryl Cunningham as Kamala 
 Franco Ressel as Groder 
 Raf Baldassarre as Fred 
 Andrea Aureli

References

External links
 
  
1969 adventure films
1969 films
Italian adventure films
Films directed by Guido Malatesta
Films set in Africa
Jungle girls
Films scored by Angelo Francesco Lavagnino
1960s Italian-language films
1960s Italian films

See also

 Jungle girl - the general type of character